Chapleau 74A is a First Nations reserve located near Chapleau, Ontario. It is one of several reserves of the Chapleau Ojibway First Nation.

References

Communities in Sudbury District
Ojibwe reserves in Ontario